A human-powered hydrofoil is a small hydrofoil watercraft propelled entirely by the muscle power of its operator(s). Hydrofoils are the fastest water-based vehicles propelled solely by human power. This speed advantage is achieved since hydrofoils lack a submerged body to provide buoyancy, greatly reducing the drag force.

Propulsion
Means of propulsion include screw propellers, as in hydrocycles; aircraft propellers, as in the Decavitator; paddles, as in a Flyak; oars, as in the Yale hydrofoil sculling project; and flapping wings, as detailed below.

Flapping wing propulsion
Flapping wing propulsion devices are hydrofoils that produce propulsion by forcing a foil to move up and down in the water. The forward motion of the foil then generates lift as in other hydrofoils. A common design consists of a large foil at the stern that is used both for propulsion and keeping the passenger above the water, connected to a smaller foil at the bow used for steering and longitudinal stability. Riders operate the vehicle by bouncing up and down on a small platform at the stern, whilst holding onto a steering column. It is started and landed from the shore, or preferably from a dock, and requires a bit of experience.

Several variations on the design have been developed:
The Wasserläufer was a forerunner of the design developed in Germany during the 1950s.
The Flying Fish was developed by Allan Abbott and Alec Brooks in 1984.
The Pogofoil, with pontoons for flotation, was developed in the US in 1989.
The Trampofoil was developed in Sweden in 1998.
The AquaSkipper was developed the US in 2003.
The Pumpabike was developed in South Africa in 2004.

Electric assist hydrofoils

The Hydrofoiler XE-1 is a Hydrofoil electric bike developed in New Zealand in 2011 onwards.

References

External links 

human-powered-hydrofoils.com - Human powered hydrofoil designs from 1953 to present
How to "Fly" a Human Powered Hydrofoil - the "Aquaskipper" (www.instructables.com)

Human-powered vehicles
Hydrofoils